Kalvoda (feminine Kalvodová) is a Czech surname. Notable people with the surname include:

 Alois Kalvoda, Czech painter
 Jan Kalvoda, Czech politician
 Leoš Kalvoda (born 1958), Czech football manager and former player

See also
Kalivoda

Czech-language surnames